Patalian is a village in the Punjab province of Pakistan. It is located at 33°6'59N 72°34'3E with an altitude of 379 metres (1246 feet).

References

Villages in Punjab, Pakistan